Lorin Gabriel Ashton, better known under his stage name Bassnectar (born February 16, 1978), is an American DJ and record producer.

Biography
Ashton grew up in the San Francisco Bay Area and attended Bellarmine College Preparatory. He  initially identified with visual arts rather than music, creating movies with his dad's camera at the age of ten. When he was 16 years old, he played in a death metal band named Pale Existence, which contributed to his heavy style of music. In the following years, he became increasingly more involved in the scene, promoting shows, distributing food and assistance to concertgoers, buying records and eventually learning to DJ after studying electronic music production. He began creating music in the 1990s, using Opcode Systems Studio Vision Pro. In the mid-1990s, he briefly toured with death metal band Exhumed as a bass player.

Bassnectar played house parties in the San Francisco Bay Area and began gaining momentum at Burning Man, often playing up to 7 sets a night. He released his first album in 2001 and performed as Bassnectar for the first time in 2002. He was previously known as DJ Lorin.

On July 3, 2020, Bassnectar announced that he was "stepping back" from music, amid allegations of sexual misconduct that had been disseminated on social media. He denied the most recent allegations as being "untrue", albeit admitting that "some of my past actions have caused pain, and I am deeply sorry."

Tours and live performances
Bassnectar performed regularly at a variety of music festivals, including Bonnaroo, Camp Bisco, Coachella, Electric Daisy Carnival, Electric Forest Festival, Lollapalooza, Okeechobee Music & Arts Festival, Life is Beautiful Festival, Oregon Eclipse, Wakarusa. In 2012, Bassnectar sold over 250,000 tickets, not including festivals.

Bassnectar finished in fourth place in the 2013 America's Best DJ competition conducted by DJ Times magazine and Pioneer DJ.

In 2015, Bassnectar stopped touring and shifted focus playing the festival circuit, and curating his own events. One such event, named 'Deja Voom'. took place from February 27 through March 2, 2019 at the Barcelo Maya Resort in Riviera Maya, Mexico. Deja Voom hosted artists across five stages: Pool Party, Beach Stage, Deja Room, Voom Room, and The Oasis. These spaces brought different sub genres of electronic bass music to cater to a variety of music tastes.

Discography

Studio albums

 Motions of Mutation (2003)
 Diverse Systems of Throb (2004)
 Mesmerizing The Ultra (2005)
 Underground Communication (2007)
 Cozza Frenzy (2009)
 Divergent Spectrum (2011)
 Vava Voom (2012)
 Noise vs. Beauty (2014)
 Into the Sun (2015)
 Unlimited (2016)
 All Colors (2020)
 The Golden Rule (2023)

References

External links
 

1978 births
Living people
American DJs
American electronic musicians
Breakbeat musicians
Dubstep musicians
Remixers
Ableton Live users
Monstercat artists
Owsla artists
Electronic dance music DJs